was a district located in Chiba Prefecture, Japan.

The district was dissolved on January 1, 1967, when the town of Yachiyo was elevated to city status.

Under the Ritsuryō system, Chiba is a district of Shimōsa Province in Tōkai Circuit.

In the Middle Ages, it was home to the Chiba clan in form of the Chiba estate (千葉荘, Chiba no shō; shō[en] were mid-ancient to medieval estates during the transition from centralized rule to feudalism). During the civil wars of the Sengoku period, most of Shimousa came under control of the Hōjō by the middle of the 16th century, until they were eventually defeated by Toyotomi Hideyoshi. At the end of the early modern Edo period, much of Chiba District was part of the shogunate domain or hatamoto holdings, other areas belonged to Sakura Domain, Oyumi Domain and Nagatoro Domain. In the Meiji Restoration, most of its shogunate/hatamoto/spiritual territories went to Katsushika Prefecture while the feudal domains were briefly formalized under the fu/han/ken (urban prefectures/domains/rural prefectures) system, then, after the abolition of domains and the subsequent first wave of prefectural mergers, it became in entirety part of Inba Prefecture in 1871, and later the namesake part of Chiba Prefecture at its establishment in 1873 as seat of the prefectural government. With the reactivation of districts as modern administrative unit in 1878 (until the 1920s), the district government was set up in Chiba Town. In the establishment of modern municipalities based on European models in 1889, the district was subdivided into one town and 17 villages. It started to lose territory to [by definition: district-independent] cities in 1921 when Chiba Town became Chiba City, to become fully extinct by 1967.

Chiba District areas
Chiba - all areas excluding parts of Midori-ku
Funabashi - eastern part of the city
Narashino - all areas
Yachiyo - all areas

Former districts of Chiba Prefecture